Gunung Karang (translations could refer to either "craggy mountain" or "coral mountain" in the Indonesian language) is a volcano at the westernmost end of Banten, Indonesia.

See also
List of Ultras of Malay Archipelago

Notes

References

External links
 Volcanological Survey of Indonesia

Stratovolcanoes of Indonesia
Subduction volcanoes
Volcanoes of Banten